Lewisham West was a borough constituency in south-east London represented in the House of Commons of the Parliament of the United Kingdom. It elected one Member of Parliament (MP) by the first past the post system of election from 1918, until it was abolished for the 2010 general election.

History

From 1966 until 1992, Lewisham West was a classic bellwether seat, being won by whichever party won the General Election (with the exception of 1979). However, long-term demographic trends have since turned the seat away from being a Labour-Conservative marginal into a safe Labour seat. Partly this has occurred because of a strong increase in the number of ethnic minority residents. At the same time, the communities of Catford, Sydenham and Forest Hill have become much less leafy and suburban over the past 30 years. The large council estate of Bellingham has always been a Labour stronghold, and the other areas of the seat can also now be regarded as quite safe for Labour, whereas in the past they were not.

Boundaries
1918–1950: The Metropolitan Borough of Lewisham wards of Brockley, Forest Hill, and Sydenham, and parts of the wards of Catford and Lewisham Village.

1950–1974: The Metropolitan Borough of Lewisham wards of Brockley, Forest Hill, Honor Oak Park, Sydenham East, and Sydenham West.

1974–1983: The London Borough of Lewisham wards of Bellingham, Culverley, Forest Hill, Honor Oak Park, Rushey Green, Sydenham East, and Sydenham West.

1983–2010: The London Borough of Lewisham wards of Bellingham, Catford, Forest Hill, Horniman, Perry Hill, Rushey Green, St Andrew, Sydenham East, and Sydenham West.

Lewisham West constituency covered the south-western part of the London Borough of Lewisham, being largely based on the communities of Catford, Sydenham, Forest Hill and Bellingham.

Boundary review
Following their review of parliamentary representation in South London, the Boundary Commission for England created a new constituency of Lewisham West and Penge, using electoral wards from Bromley and Lewisham.

Members of Parliament

Elections

Elections in the 2000s

Elections in the 1990s

Elections in the 1980s

Elections in the 1970s

Elections in the 1960s

Elections in the 1950s

Elections in the 1940s

Elections in the 1930s

Elections in the 1920s

Elections in the 1910s

See also
List of parliamentary constituencies in London

Notes and references

Sources

 

Politics of the London Borough of Lewisham
Constituencies of the Parliament of the United Kingdom established in 1918
Constituencies of the Parliament of the United Kingdom disestablished in 2010
Parliamentary constituencies in London (historic)